Deep Blue is a 1989 underwater shooter video game for the TurboGrafx-16. In it, the player controls a submersible fighter shaped as a freshwater angelfish that must fight through waves of mutated marine life.

Gameplay 

Deep Blue is a basic horizontal scrolling shooter: players collect power-ups and different weapons to fight numerous enemies. The screen scales up and down allowing more vertical space.

The game features a single life; the Angel Fish can take a lot of hits before it is destroyed, and even regenerates over time. Damage levels are represented by the color of the ship's 'eyes': they start out a solid blue, but when damaged, the eyes blink blue until going to green, then yellow, then red.

However, taking any damage will momentarily paralyze the craft, remove any speed power-ups, reset the weapon to the defeat Pulse Bullet, and remove one weapon power level.

Plot 

A hostile alien presence has descended upon the Earth's waters. Using their own bacteria, the aliens have infected and mutated numerous deep sea and marine life forms causing them to enlarge and to follow every alien command. The aliens use their infected marine life to attack the shores of the Earth's continents, initiating an invasion from the deep. Alone, players control the Earth's only defense against the attack, the A.N.G.E.L. Fish Attack Sub.

Development and release

Reception 

Deep Blue was met with lukewarm reception from critics and reviewers alike since its release.

Notes

References

External links 
 Deep Blue at GameFAQs
 Deep Blue at Giant Bomb
 Deep Blue at MobyGames

1989 video games
Horizontally scrolling shooters
Pack-In-Video games
TurboGrafx-16 games
TurboGrafx-16-only games
Video games developed in Japan
Video games with underwater settings
Single-player video games